Ishaka is a town in the Western Region of Uganda. It is one of the municipalities in Bushenyi District.

Location
The coordinates of Ishaka are 0°32'42.0"S, 30°08'18.0"E (Latitude:-0.545006; Longitude:30.138343).

Overview
Ishaka is a town in Igara County, in Bushenyi District. Together with the neighboring town of Bushenyi, it forms the Bushenyi-Ishaka Metropolitan Area.  It is the largest metropolis in the district. The district headquarters are located in Bushenyi. Kampala International University, one of the thirty-one universities in the country maintains its Western Campus in Ishaka. This campus houses Kampala International University's medical school.

Population
In 2014, the national population census put the population of Bushenyi, including Ishaka, at 41,063.

Points of interest
The following points of interest lie within the town limits or close to the town limits:

 The offices of Ishaka Town Council
 Ishaka Central Market - The largest source of fresh produce in the town 
 The Western Campus of Kampala International University, one of Uganda's private universities.
 The confluence of the Ishaka–Kagamba Road, the Kikorongo–Ishaka Road and the Mbarara–Ishaka Road, in the middle of town.
 Ishaka Adventist Hospital - A 110-bed community hospital affiliated with the Seventh-day Adventist Church
 A branch of Stanbic Bank Uganda Limited - The largest of Uganda's licensed commercial banks
 A branch of Barclays Bank of Uganda - Uganda's third-largest commercial bank by assets
 A branch of Finance Trust Bank
 A branch of Pride Microfinance Limited - A Tier III Financial Institution

The town is currently being led by mayor Kamugasha Jakson who was the first to head the municipality on its creation.

See also
 Bushenyi
 Kabwohe
 List of hospitals in Uganda
 Bushenyi District

References

External links
 Profile of Ishaka In 2011
 Website of Bushenyi District Administration

 Populated places in Western Region, Uganda
 Cities in the Great Rift Valley
 Bushenyi District